A gubernatorial election was held on 12 April 1987 to elect the Governor of Saga Prefecture.

Candidates
 - incumbent Governor of Saga Prefecture, age 71
, age 58

Results

References

Saga gubernatorial elections
1987 elections in Japan